The Opel Corsa is a supermini car engineered and produced by the German automobile manufacturer Opel since 1982. Throughout its existence, it has been sold under a variety of other brands owned by General Motors (most notably Vauxhall, Chevrolet, and Holden) and also spawned various other derivatives.

At its height of popularity, the Corsa became the best-selling car in the world in 1998, recording 910,839 sales with assembly operations in four continents and was sold under five marques with five different body styles. By 2007, over 18 million Corsas had been sold globally.



Corsa A (S83; 1982) 

The front-wheel drive Opel Corsa was first launched in September 1982. It went on sale first in France, Italy, and Spain - markets where small cars represented from 34 to 43 percent of overall automobile sales. Sales across the remainder of Europe were to have begun by March 1983. General Motors' internal code for the Corsa/Nova was the S-car.

Built in Zaragoza, Spain, the first Corsas were three-door hatchback and two-door saloon models, with four-door and five-door versions added in 1984. In certain markets, commercial "van" models were also sold, with or without rear windows depending on local requirements. In mainland Europe, the saloon versions were known as the "Corsa TR" until May 1985 and received an egg-crate grille rather than the four slits used on hatchbacks. The saloons were intended to appeal to customers of the Opel Kadett C and its sister the Vauxhall Chevette who still desired a traditional three-box sedan shape - while it did not sell particularly well in most of Europe, the TR was popular in Spain and Portugal among other markets. While only taking ten percent of French Corsa sales during the car's first half-year, the TR represented half of all Corsas sold in Spain.

The basic trim level was called just the Corsa, which was followed by the Corsa Luxus, Corsa Berlina, and the sporty Corsa SR. The SR receives a spoiler which surrounds the rear window, alloy wheels, checkered sport seats, and a somewhat more powerful  engine. Six years later, the Corsa received a facelift, which included a new front fascia and some other minor changes. The models were called LS, GL, GLS, and GT.

The Corsa A was known in the United Kingdom market as the Vauxhall Nova (as it was considered that Corsa sounded too much like "coarser"), where it was launched in April 1983, following a seven-month-long union dispute due to British workers being angry about the car not being built there, in contrast to the rival Ford Fiesta, Austin Metro and Talbot Samba. In addition, there was also a dispute about the disparity of import tariffs, as while cars exported from Spain to the European Community were subject to tariffs of only 4.4 per cent, those exported in the other direction were subject to tariffs as high as 36.7 per cent.

Power first came from 1.0 L 45 hp, 1.2 L 55 hp, and 1.3 L 70 hp petrol engines. (The first engines were all equipped with carburetors; fuel injection came later, but never for the 1.0.) The engines were based on the well proven Family I design, except for the 1.0 L and early 1.2 L engines, which were based on the OHV unit from the Kadett C.

There was also an Isuzu-built,  1.5 L turbo diesel engine available, which was also used in the Isuzu Gemini at around the same time. The diesel, along with the sporty GSi, joined the line up at the Frankfurt Motor Show in May 1987. The engines and most of the mechanical componentry were derived from those used in the Astra/Kadett. In September 1987 the Corsa received a light facelift, with a new grille that was now the same on hatchbacks and sedans, an updated interior, and other slight changes. For the 1989 model year, the 1.3 was bored out to 1.4 liters. Power remained the same, although torque increased.

A rare "Sport" model was produced in 1985 to homologate for the sub 1,300 cc class of Group A for the British Rally Championship. These Sport models were white and came with unique vinyl decals, a 13SB engine with twin Weber 40 DCOE carburettors, an optional bespoke camshaft, a replacement rear silencer, and few luxuries. This gave 93 hp and a top speed of 112 mph (180 km/h) with a 0–60 mph time of 8.9 seconds. These are by far the rarest models (500 produced) and thus acquire a high market price if one does become available.

The GSi's engine mapping had been carried out by Opel tuning specialists Irmscher. A model with the  1.4 L multi-point fuel-injected engine, which was otherwise mechanically identical to the GSi, also became available as the Nova SRi in the United Kingdom.

The design was freshened in September 1990, with new bumpers, headlights, grille, and interior, but it was clearly recognisable as a gentle makeover of an early 1980s design when it had to compete with the latest two all-new superminis in Europe – the Peugeot 106 and the Renault Clio.

Vauxhall Nova 
The Corsa A was rebadged as the Vauxhall Nova between April 1983 and March 1993 for the United Kingdom only, as it had been decided to phase out the Vauxhall brand entirely in favor of Opel in the Republic of Ireland. 
("Nova" is a trademark which GM had already used in North America). It effectively replaced the aging Chevette, which finished production in January 1984. Nearly 500,000 Novas were sold in Britain over the next ten years, but by February 2016, only 1,757 were still on the road. In its best year, 1989, it was Britain's seventh best selling car with more than 70,000 sales. All Nova models were manufactured in Spain, with the first customers in the United Kingdom taking delivery of their cars in April 1983. It gave Vauxhall a much needed modern competitor in the supermini market in the United Kingdom, as the Chevette was older than the majority of its main competitors which consisted of the Ford Fiesta and the Austin Metro. With the late 1990 facelift a small van version arrived, called the Vauxhall Nova Van.

Sales in the United Kingdom were strong right up to the end, but by the time the last Nova was built in the beginning of 1993, it was looking very dated in comparison to more modern rivals like the Peugeot 106 and the Renault Clio. Vauxhall dropped the Nova name in 1993 when their version of the Opel Corsa B made its debut, and later models were sold as the Vauxhall Corsa instead. This was the second Vauxhall to adopt the same model name as the Opel version, the first being the Senator.

A television advert in 1986 featured the Ritchie Valens hit "La Bamba" playing in the background, and used CGI to allow a Nova to drive over vehicles in a busy city. Another advert from 1990 featured a Nova as a pet, CGI allowing it to jump through a traffic jam and briefly play a hotrod whilst stopped at traffic lights. The end featured a homage to Wacky Races, with the Nova laughing like Muttley. This advert featured Angus Deayton.

Corsa B (S93; 1993) 

In April 1993, the Corsa B was unveiled and in the United Kingdom Vauxhall dropped the Nova name, with the car from now being known as the Corsa. In May 1994, it was launched by Holden in Australia, as the Barina, replacing a version of the Suzuki Swift sold under that name. This proved a success, and was the first Spanish built car to be sold in significant volumes in the Australian market.

Unlike the previous model, there was no saloon version for the European market, but one was designed in Brazil for the Latin American market, as saloons were much preferred to hatchbacks there. This was also introduced in South Africa and India. An estate car, panel van and pickup truck were also introduced, and a convertible version was produced for the Australian market, called the Holden Barina Cabrio. Chevrolet Corsa Sedan, Chevrolet Corsa Pick Up and Chevrolet Corsa Wagon were Designed by Wagner Montes Cla Dias in the GM Brasil Studios in São Caetano do Sul.

Italy was the only European country where the Argentinian-built wagon version was offered, which meant that the Italian importer had to shoulder the entire cost of homologation. In Italy, the wagon was offered with a 1.4-liter 16-valve petrol engine or the 1.7-liter turbodiesel. The Corsa also spawned a small coupé, named the Opel Tigra.

Four cylinder power came from 1.2, 1.4, and 1.6 litre Family 1 petrol engines, as well as an economical 1.5 L turbodiesel engine. Most cars received a five speed manual transmission, although a four speed automatic was also available with certain engines. In the first few years, a four speed manual was also available coupled to the smallest 1.2 litre engine.

1.0 L three cylinder and 1.2 L four-cylinder Family 0 economy version was launched in 1997, and a Lotus tuned suspension was added as well as an exterior refresh.

The saloon model was built and sold in Latin America as the Chevrolet Corsa Classic until 2010 when it was replaced with the model previously released for China in 2005 as the Buick Sail. A budget version introduced for the Brazilian market, the Chevrolet Celta, has bodywork resembling the end of the 1990s Vectra and Astra. The Celta was sold in Argentina as the Suzuki Fun for a certain period.

In 2011, General Motors stopped representing Suzuki in Argentina, so the Celta reverted to its original name under the Chevrolet brand. Argentinian production began in September 1997, where it was the first locally built Chevrolet passenger car since 1978.

The Latin American Corsa received a small facelift in 1999, with smoother bumpers, and from April 2002 (when the new Corsa II was introduced) the Corsa B began being marketed as the "Corsa Classic" until 2010, where it became the "Classic" when the Corsa B derived Chevrolet Sail and Chevrolet Celta replaced it. Production finally ceased in October 2016.

The saloon and estate car versions were produced in China by Shanghai GM as Buick Sail and Buick Sail S-RV, respectively from June 2001 to February 2005. That year, they received a facelift and became known as the Chevrolet Sail and SRV. In September 2006, Chile became the first country outside China to receive the Chinese assembled Sail; it is called the Chevrolet Corsa Plus there, available as a four-door saloon with a 1.6 L  engine. The Corsa Plus includes dual front airbags, anti-lock brakes, air conditioning, electric windows and central locking as standard equipment.

In India, the hatchback, saloon and estate car versions were sold as the Corsa Sail, Corsa (or Corsa Joy) and Corsa Swing respectively until the end of 2005. The hatchback model was still being produced, and extensively marketed in South Africa as the Corsa Lite under the Opel branding until 2009; at which point it was discontinued.

In Thailand, the Corsa was available as an Opel with a fuel-injected 8V 1.4-litre engine and "Joy" and "Swing" variants, both available with three or five-door and either a manual or an automatic gearbox.

Safety 

The Corsa was updated in 1997, resulting in different styling options and better safety features:

The Corsa Classic in its most basic Latin American configuration with no airbags received 1 star for adult occupants and 1 star for toddlers from Latin NCAP in 2011.

South Africa 
The Corsa B was manufactured in South Africa and first entered the market in November 1996, featuring three models (Lite, 130i and 130iS), all having the same 1.3L (13NE) 8 valve engine producing 58 kW. In 1999 the range was updated, dropping the 1.3L engine in favor of a 1.4 (14NE) producing 65 kW and a 1.6 (C16SE) producing 75 kW, both still being 8 valve engines. From model year 2001, a facelift was performed, resulting in some front and rear styling changes, including a new front bumper, bonnet and clear headlight lenses and new taillight lenses featuring a "bubble" look. The Corsa B continued in production post 2002, when the Corsa C was introduced, with only the 1.4-litre engine remaining available in various "Lite" trim models (three-door only) until production ultimately ceased in 2007. Alongside the three-door hatchback, four-door sedan and pickup derivatives were also available earlier on.

Specifications differed compared to European Corsa B models, with the following features offered in Europe and UK never being offered on South African models:
 16 valve engines (all models used the older SOHC 8 valve engine design)
 ABS brakes
 Airbags
 Electric windows and mirrors were never offered on any three-door models and only on the top spec (160iE) four-door sedan
 No automatic transmission option was ever offered

Mexico 

For 1995, General Motors de México first marketed the Corsa B as the Chevrolet Chevy. For 2004 (after the Corsa C had been introduced in 2002), a Mexican designed and produced version of the hatchback and saloon, known as the Chevrolet Chevy C2, was released, which was also sold in Colombia.

All Mexican previous versions were known as the Chevy, with the names Monza used on the saloon, and Swing (five-door) and Joy (three-door) for the hatchbacks, all with a 1.6-liter  four-cylinder. There was also a low-end three-door model called the Chevrolet Chevy Popular, which was equipped with a  1.4-liter engine. The latter 2004 and 2008 redesigns were simply named Chevy and Chevy Sedán. The Chevy was a favourite among taxicab drivers and one of the best selling cars in the country.

The Chevy ended production at the end of August 2011, at the Ramos Arizpe assembly plant. This move was because the Chevy's sales had been dropping constantly since the beginning of 2010, and also because it didn't meet the new safety requirement rules in Mexico that forced it to have standard front airbags.

The five-door hatchback was dropped after the 2010 model year, leaving only the four-door saloon and the three-door hatchback, this three-door hatch being the most popular model. The Chevy was discontinued only a short run of 2012 models, after almost 18 years on the Mexican market.

The successor for the three-door and saloon, the Chevrolet Sonic was also built in Ramos Arizpe starting 2012, while GM subsequently replaced the five-door Chevy with the Chevrolet Spark.

OPEL CORSA

 Opel Corsa – Europe (except the United Kingdom)
 Vauxhall Corsa – United Kingdom
 Buick Sail – China, June 2001 until February 2005
 Chevrolet Corsa – Latin America (Opel Corsa in Chile)
 Chevrolet Corsa Classic – South America, after the release of the Corsa C
 Chevrolet Classic – Brazil, since 2005; Argentina, since 2010
 Holden Barina – Australia and New Zealand (was replaced by the Daewoo Kalos from 2005)
 Opel Corsa Lite and Opel Corsa Classic – South Africa, for the hatchback and sedan versions respectively
 Opel Corsa Sail and Opel Corsa Swing – India, for the hatchback and the estate car version respectively
 Opel Vita – Japan (Toyota already registered the Corsa name for one of their domestic models, the Toyota Tercel)
 Chevrolet Chevy – Mexico, for the 2004 Corsa derived Chevy C2, facelifted at the end of 2008 for 2009. It was discontinued in the first quarter of 2012.

Derived versions
 Chevrolet Sail – China, since 2005. A new version was released in 2010 then another in 2014.
 Chevrolet Classic – Argentina and Brazil, since 2011, for the Chevrolet Sail
 Chevrolet Corsa Plus – Chile, for the Chinese built Chevrolet Sail
 Chevrolet Celta and Chevrolet Prisma – South America, for the hatchback and saloon version respectively
 Chevrolet Monza for the four-door (sedan) edition of the Chevrolet Chevy. Discontinued in spring 2012.
 Suzuki Fun – Argentina, for the Corsa derived Chevrolet Celta. Discontinued in 2011. Name switched to Chevrolet Celta.

Corsa C (X01; 2000) 

The Corsa C was revealed in 1999, and introduced to the European market in October 2000, and the facelift arrived in August 2003. General Motors dubbed the new chassis Gamma, and intended to use it for a number of other models. A saloon version was also offered in Latin America, South Africa and the Middle East. In 2002, the Corsa chassis spawned a mini MPV called the Opel Meriva, development of which began under Opel in Rüsselsheim. In Japan, where the car was sold through Yanase as the Opel Vita, where it was discontinued in April 2004 due to sluggish sales.

The vehicle won 2001 Semperit Irish Car of the Year in Ireland.

Safety 
Euro NCAP test results for a LHD, three-door hatchback variant on a registration from 2002:

Brazil 
The Brazilian version of the Corsa sold in those countries featured a more conservative front end than its European counterpart.

Brazil also offered a pickup truck version of the Corsa named the Chevrolet Montana (sold in some markets as the Tornado), which, as well as the saloon, was exported in a completely knocked down form to South Africa for local assembly.

Mexico 
The Corsa C arrived in the 2002 model year as a five-door hatchback, and was imported from Europe; but for the model year of 2003, the Corsa sold in Mexico began coming from Brazil and a saloon version was added. In 2005, the saloon version introduced a automated manual transmission called Easytronic because it was only offered in a five-speed manual transmission, however, the easytronic transmission was rapidly discontinued after the model year of 2007, because of poor sales and technical flaws.

For 2008, the Corsa was tweaked with a freshened grille, lights, and a gold-coloured Chevrolet logo. The Chevrolet Corsa C was discontinued in the Mexican market in June 2008, leaving only the older and freshened Chevy (Corsa B); and the Corsa C was replaced by the Chevrolet Aveo, however, Brazil kept the car until 2012 (as the Chevrolet Corsa Final Edition and with the saloon ending in 2011) and Argentina kept the car until 2010, while the Corsa-based Montana continued into 2010.

The Corsa C was that was sold in South America, was produced at the Rosario production plant in Argentina. The Latin American Corsa C featured the Opel inspired Chevrolet logo with a golden bowtie instead of a chromed one – the new logo was first introduced in the South American market with the new Chevrolet Vectra.

South Africa 
GM South Africa initially marketed the hatchback simply as the "New Corsa", later reverting to Corsa, while the previous generation Corsa B was still sold alongside the Corsa C and was branded as Corsa "Lite". A five-door hatchback (three-door was never offered) and four-door sedan as well as a pickup version known as the Corsa Utility was offered. In 2007, the Corsa C saloon was dropped in South Africa. The Corsa hatchback in South Africa did not have the same front fascia as the European Corsa. Instead, it had the same front fascia as the Latin American Chevrolet Corsa. Petrol engines were largely a carry over of the 8 valve SOHC variants from the Corsa B sold in South Africa, in displacements of 1.4L (65 kW), 1.6L (75 kW) and 1.8L (79 kW), the 1.8L was new for the Corsa C offered in range topping models, while this engine was never offered with a Corsa B, it was just a larger bore/stoke version of the existing engines. A 1.7DTi diesel was initially offered, with the a new 1.7CDTi diesel engine being added later.

Oceania 
In Australia, the car was launched to much fanfare from many motor journalists, and went on to win the Wheels 2001 "Car of the Year" (COTY). Holden also imported the SRi version with the 1.8L Astra motor and uprated sports suspension including traction control, ABS brakes, a better tyre/wheel combination, and Irmscher body kit to produce a "baby hot hatch" Barina.

The facelifted 2004 model was also imported; however, in December 2005, the Corsa C was suddenly dropped from the Australian and New Zealand Holden ranges as a cost-cutting measure by GM and was replaced by the Daewoo Kalos, rebadged as a Holden Barina. Motoring journalists were scathing in their criticism of the new model, particularly the bland handling, lackluster engine, and below-par safety features. The Kalos-based Barina was subsequently replaced with a rebadged version of the Chevrolet Sonic/Daewoo Kalos T300 until stocks ran out in early 2019.

United Kingdom 
This generation of the Corsa was a huge success for Vauxhall in the United Kingdom, which is the most popular supermini and second most popular car overall in 2002, 2003 and 2004. It was also Britain's best-selling supermini in 2005, achieving third place overall, but in 2006 (the final year of production) it lost top place in the supermini sector after five years and was overtaken by the Ford Fiesta. Overall, it was Britain's fourth most popular car in 2006.

Engine specifications 
The Corsa C was introduced with a 1.7 L DTI Ecotec turbodiesel engine supplied by Isuzu (Circle L) with 75 hp (55 kW). This was later joined by the 1.7 L DI Ecotec turbodiesel engine also supplied by Isuzu. From 2003, a new 1.3 L CDTI Ecotec turbodiesel engine was supplied by Fiat (MultiJet) which produced  and a 1.7 L CDTI Ecotec turbodiesel was supplied by Isuzu which produced . This new 1.7 L CDTI Ecotec featured a variable geometry turbocharger.

The 1.0 L and 1.2 L Ecotec Family 0 engines are carry overs from the Corsa B; the 1.4 L Family 1 engine was replaced with a new 1.4 L Family 0 model. The edition with the 1.8 L engine was named Corsa GSi and was the predecessor of the new Corsa OPC.

In 2003, Opel introduced updated versions of Family 0 engines with TwinPort technology, and the 1.2 L engine gained 30 cc, giving it .

Corsa D (S07; 2006) 

The Corsa D was created using a new version of the SCCS platform, which was co-developed by General Motors/Opel and Fiat, and is also employed by the 2005 Fiat Grande Punto. The first official pictures of the Corsa D were released by Opel in May 2006. In the United Kingdom, What Car? awarded it 2007 Car of the Year. The Corsa D placed second in the European Car of the Year for 2006, only behind the Ford S-Max.

The Corsa D is available in both three and five-door versions and marketed as the Vauxhall Corsa in the United Kingdom.

The  OPC/VXR version went on sale in the beginning of 2007, with a 1.6 L turbocharged petrol engine powering the front wheels.

The  1.3 CDTI engine was updated in the middle of 2007 to bring CO2 levels to just 119 g/km, meaning that twelve months' Vehicle Excise Duty in the United Kingdom costs £30 and is eligible for the Plan 2000E (a rebate of €2000 in the purchase of a new car) in Spain.

The Corsa D was briefly available in Australia under the Opel brand name, rather than as a Holden as the Corsa B and C had previously been, during Opel's short-lived foray into the Australian market. Less than a year after launching, Opel Australia announced it was ceasing operations, removing the Corsa from the Australian market.

The Corsa D was never available in Japan, as Yanase had stopped importing the Opel Vita in April 2004, due to declining sales. Opel withdrew altogether from the Japanese market in December 2006, due to low sales the previous year.

At an early stage of the Corsa D's development in 2004, Dietmar Finger was tasked to design the outer panel for the glove box in the Corsa. Allegedly, his son suggested drawing a shark instead. The designer managed to hide it so well, on the hinge of the glove compartment that it was never removed, and featured on all production models. The custom of having a shark graphic in the interior continued for other Opel cars even after Opel has been taken over by PSA.

Safety 
Euro NCAP test results for a LHD, three-door hatchback variant on a registration from 2006:

FlexFix 
FlexFix is an optional integrated bicycle rack. It is essentially a concealed drawer that can be pulled out from the car's rear bumper. Attached are two-wheel mount bike racks, rear number plate incorporated in the system, brake/tail lights, indicators and fog and reverse light alternates in left-hand drive and right-hand drive cars. It is available as an option on Exclusiv, SE, and SXi models in the United Kingdom.

OPC 
In 2007, Opel introduced a sport version of the Corsa tuned by Opel Performance Center (OPC) – Corsa OPC. Differences from the standard Corsa in the interior are sporty Recaro seats, OPC steering wheel and gear knob and instrument dials with OPC background.

On the exterior, there are different front and rear bumpers with triangle-shaped exhaust, and wind diffusers. There are also OPC tail spoilers and skirts. The car has stiffer and lower suspension than the regular Corsa as well. Standard rims are 17 inches and an optional 18 inches. The Corsa OPC was only available as a three-door version.

OPC Nürburgring Edition 

The Opel Performance Center in 2011 launched a hardcore version of the Corsa OPC called the Corsa OPC Nürburgring Edition. The engine is the same, 1.6 litre turbo, but it has been tuned to punch out  and 250 Nm (280 Nm with overboost function) of torque at 2,250 to 5,850 rpm.

New upgrades include Brembo brake packages, recalibrated ABS, traction stability management system, Remus exhaust, and a mechanical limited slip differential, which in this segment of cars (supermini/B segment), only the MINI Cooper JCW has.

This Corsa comes with a standard 18-inch alloy wheels and low profile tires, lowered suspension, dual tipped stainless steel exhaust, and special Nurburgring badge at B pillars and inside on gear knob and instrument dials. Also included is a new front spoiler, and different rear bumper. This Corsa is available in Henna Red, Grasshopper Green, Graphite Black (available as matte colour), and Casablanca White.

Engines 
Petrol engines are Family 0 (1.0–1.4) and Family 1 (1.6), and diesel engines are derivative from MultiJet (1.3) and Circle L (1.7).

Facelift 
The Opel Corsa boasted a new petrol and diesel engine line up that fully complies with Euro 5 standards. The ride and handling were also improved. Engines were further improved from 2011 as Start/Stop was added to engines, with all engines expecting to get the technology in the future.

Engines with (S/S) are in bold in CO2 column

Hybrid 
At the 2007 Frankfurt Motor Show, Opel unveiled the Opel Corsa Hybrid Concept, a coupe that combines a belt-driven starter and alternator with a lithium-ion battery.

Facelift 
In November 2010, a facelift was announced. A revised front end was the most dramatic difference over its predecessor, consisting of a new grille, a restyled front bumper and new 'Eagle Eye' headlamps (introduced on the Insignia) which contain daytime running lamps, standard across the refreshed Corsa range. (Vauxhall versions gained the latest badge from 2008 on the front grille, tailgate and steering wheel). A new 'Touch and Connect' multimedia system from Bosch was made available as an option on certain Corsas, replacing the CD60 unit. Alloy wheels are upgraded on SXI, SE and OPC/VXR versions. Production ended in the end of 2014, with the Adam styled Corsa E released.

Corsa E (X15; 2014) 

The Corsa E debuted at the 2014 Paris Motor Show.

Interior space stayed the same, as did the 285-litre boot, but the interior was completely new. All of the exterior sheet metal (except the roof) was revised, but the underlying chassis and body structure, the glasshouse, as well as some minor parts such as side-view mirrors and turn signal repeaters, were carried over from the Corsa D.

Safety
The Corsa in its standard European configuration received 4 stars from Euro NCAP in 2014.

Corsa OPC/VXR 
In February 2015, Opel introduced OPC version of Corsa E. Compared to the previous generation model, power output had increased by 15PS to 207PS (204 bhp) from 1.6 Turbo engine, with a maximum torque of 245 Nm (181 lb-ft) between 1900 and 5800 rpm. An overboost function increased torque to 280Nm (210 lb-ft) when needed. As a result, the Corsa OPC was able to sprint from 0 to 100 km/h (62 mph) in 6.8 seconds and to reach a maximum speed of 230 km/h (143 mph).

The Corsa OPC featured a sports chassis with Frequency Selective Damping (FSD) technology, which enabled the damping forces to adapt to the frequency of the car to balance sportiness with comfort. The suspension was lowered by 10mm (0.39 in) compared to standard Corsa models, and the car also received an optimised steering system with more direct and precise reactions. OPC also worked on the brakes, adding 308mm discs on the front axle.

Opel also offered the Corsa OPC Performance Package, which included a mechanical multi-disc differential lock made by Drexler, 18-inch wheels with Michelin tires, and an even more athletic chassis set up. The package also brought a Brembo high-performance braking system with 330mm braking discs on the front axle.

Styling-wise, the Corsa OPC/VXR received more aggressive body kits with new bumpers, aluminium frames for the fog lights, a small scoop in the hood, a big roof spoiler, and twin-pipe Remus exhaust with a diffuser.
Inside, the Recaro performance seats took centre stage, with other upgrades including the flat-bottomed leather steering wheel, OPC gear knob, and sports pedals, as well as OPC design instruments.

Engines 
Under the bonnet, all new 1.0-litre three-cylinder ECOTEC engine – the direct-injection turbo offered 90 PS or 115 PS – both giving 170Nm of torque – with a six-speed manual 'box, while a new six-speed auto was optional on selected engines. Start/Stop tech as standard and, in three-door guise, the lower-powered model could hit sub-100g/km CO2 emissions.

The entry-level engine was a 70 PS 1.2-litre petrol, while turbo and non-turbo 1.4s offered 100 PS and 90 PS respectively. The 1.3 CDTI continued with 75PS, now hitting as little as 85g/km CO2 emissions, and was capable of 3,2l/100 km economy. An ecoFLEX version was available from launch, too, with target CO2 emissions of under 85g/km.

Corsa F (2019) 

The original project of Corsa F (project code: G2J0) was initially planned to be released in the third quarter of 2017 on a GM platform, the G2XX. However, the G2J0 project was cancelled due to Groupe PSA's acquisition of Opel and Vauxhall, with the cancelled project reaching production in a sedan form as the Buick Excelle in China. Development was then restarted after switching to the PSA CMP (EMP1) platform in 2017. The Corsa is thus the first of the Opel/Vauxhall models developed under the PSA ownership.

Safety
The Corsa in its standard European configuration received 4 stars from Euro NCAP in 2019.

Corsa-e 
In December 2018, Opel announced the launch of an electric version of the Corsa, called the Corsa-e, which was originally planned to go on sale in 2019, but was delayed into the second quarter of 2020. In the UK, the Corsa-e is sold under the Vauxhall marque. The main competitors to the Corsa-e were expected to be the Nissan Leaf and the Renault Zoe, as well as its mechanically identical twin, the Peugeot e-208.

The Corsa-e has the same drivetrain as the e-208. Under the WLTP driving cycle, the Corsa-e has an estimated range of  using a 50.0 kW-hr battery (gross), which is carried in the floor.

Externally, the standard Corsa F is almost identical to the electric version, with the exception of different alloy wheel designs and the lack of exhaust. The interior will include a touchscreen infotainment system with two set-ups available; seven-inch Multimedia Navi system or 10-inch Multimedia Navi Pro (exclusive to the top-level Elite Premium trim).

Interior styling and controls generally are simpler than the e-208. In the UK, the Corsa-e is sold in four trim levels (from base Griffin through SE Premium, SRi Premium, and Elite Premium).

Powertrain 

The Corsa F supermini marks the arrival of new petrol and diesel engines as well as an all-electric Corsa-e into the range. Two petrol engines and one diesel engine are available, starting with the 1.2-litre three-cylinder engine that produces 75 bhp and comes with a five-speed manual gearbox as standard. Sitting above is a three-cylinder 1.2-litre turbo PureTech engine which is shared with Peugeot and Citroen models and produces 99 bhp and 205 Nm of torque. It comes with a six-speed manual or eight-speed automatic gearbox option. The diesel engine is a BlueHDi 1.5-litre four-cylinder diesel, producing 99 bhp and 250 Nm of torque.

Weight of the car is also improved, with lightweight underpinnings, redesigned bodyshell and new aluminium engines which Opel claims 10 percent of kerb weight have been reduced across the range and will have a good balance between sportiness and comfort. The body is constructed from a range of high-strength steels, saving a total of 40 kg over the seventh-generation model. A new aluminium bonnet will also replace the previous generation's steel unit, saving a further 2.4 kg. However, the Corsa is slightly larger than its predecessor, with a larger body and longer wheelbase to allocate more interior and boot space.

Opel's latest range of aluminium three-cylinder petrol and diesel engines are projected to save around 15 kg over the predecessor four-cylinder units. 10 kg has been reduced off the seats, losing 5.5 kg at the front and 4.5 kg at the rear, totalling around 108 kg of weight reduction.

In June 2019 it was revealed that first deliveries were scheduled to start in April 2020, while the pure-electric model was planned to follow at a time that has not yet been announced.

Recalls 
On 11 May 2020, Opel recalled Corsas manufactured between 25 September and 30 December 2019 because the steering column was not manufactured according to the specifications, causing steering failure and leading to the car losing control, increasing the risk of an accident.

On 6 November 2020, Opel Corsas manufactured between 18 March 2019 and 14 February 2020 were recalled due to the high-pressure pump not being tightened to the engine with correct torque, causing a potential fuel leak.

Corsa Van 
The Corsa Van was a car derived van based on the corresponding generation of the Corsa superminis that was produced from 1983 to 2018. It first appeared in 1983, and was unchanged from the regular car, aside from the panelled rear windows (optional, glazed models were also available) and the missing rear seat. This was replaced by a flat metal loading floor.

It was usually marketed under the names used in various countries, such as Corsa Lieferwagen (Germany), Bestelwagen (Dutch), or Fourgonnette (French). The Vauxhall version is called the "Corsavan" since 1994, linking it to the earlier Astravan model. Earlier models were called Vauxhall Novavan in the United Kingdom.

Corsa Van variants of later generation Corsas have also been sold under the Opel/Vauxhall brand. It was discontinued in 2018.

Popularity 
From the first Corsa being sold in the United Kingdom on 2 April 1993, sales had reached 1,371,573 within sixteen years of its launch, by which time the Corsa was in its third generation.

As of 2018, the Vauxhall Corsa was the third most popular car in the United Kingdom, with 1,205,158 taxed and on the road with another 39,286 declared SORN (Statutory Off Road Notification).

In 2021, the Vauxhall Corsa grabbed the top spot for the most popular car of the year having had more new cars registered than any other in the UK throughout 2021. The Corsa managed to achieve 40,914 new registrations throughout the year, beating second place by over 6,000 registrations. This meant that the Ford Fiesta was finally beaten after holding the mantle of most popular car for 12 successive years. In fact, the Ford Fiesta didn't even achieve a top 10 finish after being heavily affected by chip shortages and Ford prioritising sales of more profitable SUVs, such as the Puma.

Notes

References

External links 

 Opel Corsa on Opel Media Site
 Official international Opel Corsa website
 Vauxhall Corsa official website(Vauxhall UK)
 Ireland official Opel Corsa website
 Opel Corsa Blueprints

Corsa
Subcompact cars
Euro NCAP superminis
Latin NCAP superminis
Hatchbacks
Coupé utilities
Sedans
Station wagons
Front-wheel-drive vehicles
Cars introduced in 1982
1980s cars
1990s cars
2000s cars
2010s cars
Cars of Germany
Rally cars
Touring cars
Production electric cars